A fondo was a Spanish television interview program hosted by Joaquín Soler Serrano that was broadcast on La Primera Cadena of Televisión Española from 1976 until 1981.

The program's mission statement, according to its opening title cards, was to interview "the leading figures in letters, the arts, and sciences." Beginning with Jorge Luis Borges, who was the guest on the first episode of A fondo aired on September 8, 1976, the program played host to some of the Spanish speaking world's most respected intellectuals of the day.

In 1976 critics awarded the show a Premio Ondas in the "national television" category.

People interviewed on A fondo

Actors 
 Adolfo Marsillach
 Alberto Sordi
 Geraldine Chaplin
 Imperio Argentina
 José Luís López Vázquez
 Luis Alcoriza
 Marcello Mastroianni
 María Casares
 Núria Espert
 Sophia Loren

Anthropologists 
 Julio Caro Baroja

Cartoonists 
 Joaquín Salvador Lavado ("Quino")

Scientists 
 Francisco Grande Covián
 Joan Oró
 Josep Trueta
 Severo Ochoa

Filmmakers 
 Alberto Lattuada
 Bernardo Bertolucci
 Elia Kazan
 Emilio Fernández
 Federico Fellini
 Franco Zeffirelli
 Gillo Pontecorvo
 Leopoldo Torre Nilsson
 Liliana Cavani
 Luigi Comencini
 Luis García Berlanga
 Marco Ferreri
 Néstor Almendros
 Otto Preminger
 Roberto Rossellini
 Roman Polanski

Composers 
 Alberto Ginastera
 Arthur Rubinstein
 Ennio Morricone
 Frederic Mompou
 Joaquín Rodrigo
 Pablo Sorozábal
 Yehudi Menuhin

Sculptors 
 Frederic Marès
 Pablo Serrano

Philosophers 
 José Ferrater Mora
 José Luis López Aranguren
 Juan David García Bacca
 Julián Marías
 Régis Debray

Comedians 
 Miguel Gila

Religious figures 
 Teresa de Calcuta

Linguists 
 Francesc de Borja Moll

Doctors 
 Ramón Castroviejo Briones
 Silvio Fanti

Musicians 
 Andrés Segovia
 Frederic Mompou
 Narciso Yepes
 Alicia de Larrocha

Journalists 
 Ángel Zúñiga Izquierdo
 José Ortega Spottorno
 Juan Aparicio López
 Rafael Martínez Nadal

Pilots 
 Hans-Ulrich Rudel
 Juan Manuel Fangio

Painters 
 Antonio Saura
 Benjamín Palencia
 Elmyr de Hory
 Joan Ponç
 Manuel Viola
 Maruja Mallo
 Modest Cuixart
 Rafael Durancamps
 Salvador Dalí

Politicians 
Richard Nixon
Victoria Kent
Luis Alberto Machado

Singers
 Alfredo Zitarrosa
 Atahualpa Yupanqui
 Chabuca Granda
 Facundo Cabral
 Joan Manuel Serrat
 Julio Iglesias
 Libertad Lamarque
 Matilde Urrutia
 Raphael
 Regino Sainz de la Maza

Writers 
 Alain Robbe-Grillet
 Alejo Carpentier
 Álvaro Cunqueiro
 Antonio Buero Vallejo
 Antonio Di Benedetto
 Antonio Gala
 Antonio Skármeta
 Aquilino Duque 
 Arturo Uslar Pietri
 Augusto Roa Bastos
 Camilo José Cela
 Carlos Barral
 Carlos Fuentes
 Carmen Martín Gaite
 Dámaso Alonso
 Diego Fabbri
 Dominique Lapierre
 Ernesto Giménez Caballero
 Ernesto Sabato
 Eugène Ionesco
 Fernando Fernán Gómez
 Francisco Ayala
 Francisco Candel
 Francisco Umbral
 Frederick Forsyth
 Gabriel Celaya
 Lanza del Vasto
 Gonzalo Torrente Ballester
 Guillermo Cabrera Infante
 Jesús Fernández Santos
 Joan Brossa
 Jorge Amado
 Jorge Edwards
 Jorge Luis Borges (first interviewed in 1976 and again in 1980)
 Jorge Semprún
 José Donoso
 José Luis de Vilallonga
 Josep Pla
 Juan Carlos Onetti
 Juan García Hortelano
 Juan Larrea
 Juan Marichal
 Juan Rulfo
 Julio Caro Baroja
 Julio Cortázar
 Luis Rosales
 Manuel Mujica Láinez
 Manuel Puig
 Manuel Scorza
 Manuel Vázquez Montalbán
 Marguerite Duras
 Mario Benedetti
 Mario Vargas Llosa
 Mercè Rodoreda
 Miguel Delibes
 Octavio Paz
 Rafael Alberti
 Ramón J. Sender
 Rosa Chacel
 Salvador Espriu
 Severo Sarduy
 Terenci Moix
 Teresa Pàmies

References

Spanish television talk shows
RTVE shows